Renelda Swan (born 12 December 1957) is a Bermudian sprinter. He competed in the men's 400 metres at the 1976 Summer Olympics.

References

1957 births
Living people
Athletes (track and field) at the 1976 Summer Olympics
Bermudian male sprinters
Olympic athletes of Bermuda
Athletes (track and field) at the 1978 Commonwealth Games
Commonwealth Games competitors for Bermuda
Place of birth missing (living people)